Mahora may refer to:
Mahora, Spain, in Albacete
Mahora, New Zealand, in Hawke's Bay
Mahora Secondary School, a fictional school in anime Negima! Magister Negi Magi
Mahora, a mountain of Gorgany in the Carpathians